The Port Moller Hot Springs Village Site is a prehistoric archeological site on the Alaska Peninsula.  It is located on the shores of Moller Bay, an indentation on the peninsula with extensive tidal flats.  Until historical times the area was a border region between the Aleut and the Inuit.  The site is notable for the presence of a sulphurous hot spring, which provides drinkable water.  The  site contains the remains of a native village and extensive refuse middens.  The site was first excavated in 1928.

The site was listed on the National Register of Historic Places in 1979.

See also
National Register of Historic Places listings in Aleutians East Borough, Alaska

References

Further reading
 "Prehistoric Aleut Influences at Port Moller, Alaska

Archaeological sites on the National Register of Historic Places in Alaska
National Register of Historic Places in Aleutians East Borough, Alaska